The 1900 Olympic Croquet two-ball singles tournament was held on 4 and 11 July 1900. Eight athletes from France competed. The event was won by Chrétien Waydelich, the only person to earn two singles medals in Olympic croquet (with a bronze in the one-ball competition as well). Silver went to Maurice Vignerot and bronze to Jacques Sautereau.

Background

This was the only appearance of the event at the Olympics; it was one of three croquet competitions in 1900. Croquet was one of the first Olympic sports open to women (with only sailing having female competitors before croquet, due to that sport taking place earlier in 1900), with two of the six players in this event being women.

Competition format

The competition format is unclear. There were two rounds. The first round appears to have been a head-to-head, best-of-three competition. The winners advanced to the second round, as did one of the losers. The second round appears to have been a round-robin with each match being best-of-three.

Schedule

Results

Round 1

Final

The second round was conducted as a round-robin.

Results summary

References

 De Wael, Herman. Herman's Full Olympians: "Croquet 1900". Accessed 10 January 2006.
 Mallon, Bill. "The First Two Women Olympians" in Citius, Altius, Fortius, Autumn 1995, No. 3, p. 38. Available in pdf format from the AAFLA .
 

Singles Two